Arthur Louis Schechter (born December 6, 1939) is an American attorney, philanthropist, diplomat, socialite and senior partner at Schechter, McElwee, Shaffer, and Harris based in Houston, Texas. He attended public schools and graduated from Lamar High School. Schechter graduated from the University of Texas in Plan II Honors Program with a BA and received a JD degree from the University of Texas Law School in 1964.  He also subsequently attended the University of Houston for a master's degree in Political Science and Foreign Affairs.  Schechter previously served as the United States Ambassador to the Bahamas. He was confirmed by the U.S. Senate and was appointed by President Bill Clinton on October 29, 1998. After returning Schechter chaired the Harris County Metropolitan Transit Authority.  Schechter's main practice was admiralty law, and he represented many maritime unions from around the world, including the National Maritime Union and the International Transport Workers Federation.

Philanthropic service 
Schechter has served on boards of philanthropic organizations, but not limited to:
 AIDS Foundation advisory board; American Constitution Society for Law
 American Israeli Public Affairs Committee (Washington group), co-chair fundraiser honoring entire Texas Delegation, United Jewish Campaign, Houston chairman, Lawyer Division chair
 American Jewish Committee (advisory board, past president, executive committee, National Leadership Council, International Affairs chairman, Blaustein Leadership Institution, dinner chair for fundraising events)
 Anti-Defamation League (Southwest Regional Board, nominating committee, legal committee)
 Bank of Harris County (board of directors)
 Career and Recovery Resources, Inc. (advisory board, campaign advisory committee)
 Child Advocates of Houston; Commission on Jewish Continuity
 Congregation Beth Israel (advisory board, past president, vice president, executive committee, Men's Club president, endowment committee, chairman nominating committee, insurance committee)
 Council of American Ambassadors (board)
 Frank Evans Center for Conflict Resolutions, South Texas College of Law (advisory board)
 Frost Bank (advisory board
 GLBT Political Caucus
 Greater Houston Convention & Visitors Bureau (advisory board)
 Greater Houston Partnership (executive committee, mobility committee)
 Gulf Coast Regional Mobility Partners (executive committee)
 Harris County Metropolitan Transit Authority (chairman of the board, METRO transition committee, transportation & infrastructure advisory committee)
 Holocaust Museum Houston (advisory board, executive committee)
 Houston Area Parkinson Society (board member, advisory director)
 Houston International Travelers Task Force (co-chairman.  Appointed by Houston Mayor Bill White)
 Houston Jewish Community Foundation (executive committee)
 Houston Super Bowl (steering committee)
 Houston Term Limits Committee (chairman)
 Houston World Affairs Council (member)
 Institute for International Education (Southern Regional advisory board)
 Jewish Federation of Houston (President, vice-president, board of directors, executive committee, advisory board)
 Israel Bonds (Prime Minister's Club, National Campaign Cabinet)
 Lee P. Brown Center for Public Service (board of directors)
 Jewish Community Center (endowed room in Merfish Center, endowment board)
 Lillian Kaiser Lewis Foundation (chairman of the board, trustee.  Hundreds of thousands of dollars in grants to Houston-based charities)
 Mickey Leland Kibbutz Foundation (board of directors)
 Moshe Dayan Center for Middle Eastern and African Studies, Tel Aviv University
 NAACP (Member)
 National Jewish Democratic Council (chairman emeritus, board of directors, executive committee)
 Operation Exodus (chairman)
 SEARCH (board of directors, executive committee and Policy Team)
 Seven Acres Jewish Geriatrics Center (board of directors, chairman of Big Gifts Committee, endowed "Schechter Dining Room" for Alzheimer's/Dementia Patients, lobby, lobby reception's room, co-chaired numerous fundraising events)
 Serve Houston (board of directors, Local AmeriCorps Chapter)
 Shlenker School (board of directors, Endow classroom)
 Texas Association of Civil Trial and Appellate Specialists (member)
 Texas Jewish Historical Society (board of directors)
 Texans Together Education Fund (advisory board)
 Theatre Under the Stars (founding board of directors)
 University of Texas at Austin (Life Member Texas Students Association, Friar Alumni, President's Council, Littlefield Society, Hillel Foundation, Benefactor to Lloyd Bentsen Stroke Fund, School of Law Alumni Association)
 University of Texas Health Science Center (development board of directors, political committee)
 Unity Bank (advisory board)
 United States Holocaust Museum Council, Washington, D.C. (national chairman appointed by President Clinton, Holocaust Studies)
 University of North Texas, Ann Richards College of Community and Affairs (steering committee)
 William A. Lawson Institute for Peace and Prosperity (WALIPP/Lawson Academy; chairman of advisory board, board of directors)
 Westwood Country Club (Secretary, executive committee)

Awards and honors
 21st Century Democrats "Star of Texas" Award
 AIPAC's "Southwest Region Award for Political Achievement"
 American Biographical Institute "Community Leader of America"
 Baylor College of Medicine: "Houston’s Most Fascinating"
 Career and Recovery Resources, Inc.’s "Barrier Breaker Award"
 Children's Advocates of Harris County "Love Award"
 Congregation Beth Israel "Samuel E. Karff Leadership Award"
 Council of Jewish Women "Starlight Leadership Award"
 Harris County Democratic Party Johnson-Rayburn Fundraising Event—Leadership Award for a Lifetime of Service
 Henry Morganthau Award for Legal Excellence
 Houston's Best Lawyers
 Houston City Council and the mayor of the City of Houston Proclamation "Arthur Louis Schechter Day" for involvement with Harris County Metropolitan Transit Authority
 Houston Top Lawyer
 Interfaith Ministries for Greater Houston Tapestry for Outstanding Community Leadership
 Jewish American Politics Feature
 Jewish Chautauqua Society "Benefactor Award"
 Jewish Community Center "David H. White Award for Outstanding Leadership"
 Jewish Federation of Greater Houston "Local Legend"
 Jewish Philanthropies "Star of David Award"
 Millennium Maker—book by Evelyn Thayer of 100 most prominent Houstonians
 NAACP "President’s Award"
 National American Jewish Committee "National Human Relationships Award"
 National Jewish Democratic Council "Lifetime Achievement Award" presented by President Clinton
 National United Jewish Campaign's Prime Minister's Council (national vice-chairman of mission)
 Operation Bahamas, Turks and Cacicos (OPBAT) Operations Center (US Coast Guard, Royal Bahamas Police Force, Drug Enforcement Administration, 	 Turks and Caicos Islands Police) Award for "your unyielding dedication, service and loyalty"
 SEARCH "Outstanding Leadership Award" and Leadership/Appreciation plaque
 Seven Acres Spirit of Life Award
 Texas Monthly Magazine "Super Lawyer"
 Top Ladies of Distinction "Prominent Community Leader"
 The Social Book "Houston Treasure"
 United Jewish Appeal "Young Leadership Award"
 United States Coast Guard "Distinguished Public Service Award" in recognition of "notable services which have greatly assisted in furthering the aims and functions of the Coast Guard"
 United States Customs Service Award for Outstanding Public Service presented The Royal Bahamas Police Force Award in recognition of "An era of Loyalty, A cornerstone of example; A benchmark of leadership in the courageous stance that you have taken in the fight against drug trafficking during your tenure in The Bahama
 United States Drug Enforcement Administration "US Special Award" for outstanding friendship, dedication and contributions to the Counter Drug Mission, Operations Bahamas Turks and Caicos Islands and the Nassau Bahamas
 United States Marine Corps Award in grateful recognition of Support of the Marine Security Guard Detachment, Nassau, Bahamas
 United States Military:   "Joint Special Operations Command Award" to "Arthur ‘Commando’ Schechter, ambassador to the Commonwealth of the Bahamas...The Soldiers, Sailors, Airmen, Marines and Civilians of the Joint Special Operations Command extend their special thanks for your tremendous support during Exercise Bow Draw.  Your exceptional dedication to duty and personal commitment in support of this Command has enable the Joint Community to conduct realistic training and hone their SOF warfighting skills"
 University of Texas Interfraternity Council "Notable Alumni"

Education 
Lamar High School, honor graduate, Rosenberg, Texas, 1958.  Accolades: Most Popular Boy and Outstanding Student.  Positions held:  vice-president, senior class; student council officer; president, teen council; founder, Teens Against Polio.

Bachelor of Arts, Plan II, University of Texas, 1962.  Accolades:  Cactus Outstanding Student; National Phil Goodman Award for Outstanding Member of Phi Sigma Delta (ZBT) in America:  Positions held:  vice president, Silver Spurs; officer, Friar Society (6 or Fewer Outstanding Men on Campus);  chair, Campus Chest "Challenge"; chair to numerous committees in student government and student union; board member, Texas Union; assemblyman, College of Liberal Arts and Sciences.

Juris Doctor (J.D.) University of Texas School of Law, 1964.

University of Houston, Master's Program.  Worked toward a master's degree in political science and foreign affairs. (Studied foreign affairs in the Soviet Union, international organizations and polices of all major powers.)

Also attended:  Jacob Baustein Leadership Institute, United States Department of States, Foreign Service Institute, 1998 (Ambassadors Training Course);  Completed continuing education for mediators/arbitrators in 2001.

Personal life 
Schechter resides in Houston, Texas, with his wife, Joyce Proler Schechter, whom he married on August 25, 1956. They have two daughters: Leslie Rose Karpas (Hedley) born in 1966, and Jennifer Rose Schechter (Alan, Harris County Constable) born in 1968. They have five grandchildren: Brian Arthur Karpas, Alyssa Rose Karpas, Kacy Michelle Rosen, Samuel Arthur Rosen, and Lillie Joy Rosen.

References

External links 
 
 sms legal
 https://web.archive.org/web/20110716013551/http://www.schechtergroup.com/html/about.html

1939 births
Living people
Ambassadors of the United States to the Bahamas
Texas lawyers
University of Texas System
People from Houston
People from Rosenberg, Texas